Manuel Späth (born 16 October 1985) is a German handballer who plays as a pivot for HSV Hamburg and the German national team.

References

1985 births
Living people
German male handball players
People from Ostfildern
Sportspeople from Stuttgart (region)
FC Porto handball players